This was the first edition of the tournament.

Nicole Vaidišová won in the final, beating Nadia Petrova, 6–1, 6–7(5–7), 7–5.

Seeds

Draw

Finals

Top half

Bottom half

References

External links
http://www.itftennis.com/procircuit/tournaments/women's-tournament/info.aspx?tournamentid=1100012738&event=

Singles
PTT Bangkok Open - Singles
 in women's tennis